The 1966 All-Ireland Senior Football Championship was the 80th staging of the All-Ireland Senior Football Championship, the Gaelic Athletic Association's premier inter-county Gaelic football tournament. The championship began on 1 May 1966 and ended on 25 September 1966.

Galway entered the championship as the defending champions in search of a third successive championship title.

On 25 September 1966, Galway won the championship following a 1-10 to 0-7 defeat of Meath in the All-Ireland final. This was their seventh All-Ireland title overall and their third championship in succession.

Fermanagh's P. T. Treacy was the championship's top scorer with 4-12. Galway's Mattie McDonagh was the choice for Texaco Footballer of the Year.

Connacht Championship format change

Normal system back with just 1 Quarter-final vs 2 Semi-finals as usual.

Results

Connacht Senior Football Championship

Quarter-final

Semi-finals

Final

Leinster Senior Football Championship

First round

Quarter-finals

Semi-finals

Final

Munster Senior Football Championship

Quarter-finals

Semi-finals

Final

Ulster Senior Football Championship

Preliminary round

 
Quarter-finals

Semi-finals

Final

All-Ireland Senior Football Championship

Semi-finals

Final

Championship statistics

Miscellaneous

 Cork stop Kerry to 9 Munster titles in a row in the Munster final.
 The All Ireland semi-final between Meath and Down was their first ever championship meeting.
 Galway were All Ireland Champions for the third year in a row and Connacht champions for the fourth year in a row.

Top scorers

Overall

Single game

References